Marc Spiegler (born 1968) is an American/French art journalist and columnist since 1998. In 2012 he became global director of Art Basel. He is ranked in ArtReview's Power 100 among the top 25 most influential individuals in the art world. He leads Art Basel's Executive Committee, with Maia Guarnaccia, Commercial Director, Frank Lasry, Director Resources and Finance, Adeline Ooi, Director Asia, Marco Preda, Director Digital as members. Spiegler is the successor to Sam Keller. In November 2022 he stepped down and was replaced by Noah Horowitz.

Career and background
Spiegler studied Political Science in the United States at Haverford College between 1986 and 1990, and attended the Medill School of Journalism at Northwestern University from 1992 to 1994, earning a Masters of Journalism. Spiegler, a citizen of France has been a freelance art journalist and columnist since 1998, writing for such magazines and newspapers as The Art Newspaper, Art+Auction, ARTnews, Neue Zürcher Zeitung, and New York. He has also served as moderator and panelist at various symposiums and round tables.

References

1968 births
Living people
French art critics
American art critics
People from Chicago
Medill School of Journalism alumni
Journalists from Illinois
Haverford College alumni